Néstor Rubén Di Luca (born April 8, 1955 in Tres Arroyos (Buenos Aires), Argentina) is a former Argentine footballer who played for clubs of Argentina and Chile.

Teams
  Independiente 1977-1979
  San Lorenzo de Mar del Plata 1980-1981
  Huracán 1982
  Universidad de Chile 1983-1984
  Huracán 1985-1989
  Huracán de Tres Arroyos 1990-1991

External links
 

1955 births
Living people
Argentine footballers
People from Tres Arroyos
Argentine expatriate footballers
Club Atlético Independiente footballers
Huracán de Tres Arroyos footballers
Club Atlético Huracán footballers
Universidad de Chile footballers
Chilean Primera División players
Argentine Primera División players
Expatriate footballers in Chile
Association footballers not categorized by position
Sportspeople from Buenos Aires Province